Ningalkkum Aakaam Kodeeshwaran is an Indian Malayalam-language game show. It is an adaptation of the British Sony Pictures Television game show Who Wants to Be a Millionaire? and its Hindi version Kaun Banega Crorepati. The show is hosted by actor Suresh Gopi.

Series Overview

Background
In 2011, Business Standard announced that Kaun Banega Crorepati was going to be remade into five regional Indian languages. Suresh Gopi was selected to host the Malayalam version and was quoted saying:

The episodes for Ningalkkum Aakam Kodeeshwaran were shot at AVM Studios in Chennai, where its Tamil equivalent Neengalum Vellalam Oru Kodi was also shot.

Production

Season 1
Shyla CK, a contestant from Idukki, was the first person to win 50,00,000/- in the show, the highest amount won in the season. Shyla correctly answered the 14th question worth 50 lakhs/-, but she quit on the final question.

The tagline of the season used for was Oru Chodyam Madi Jeevidam Mari Marayan (English: One Question Is Enough For Life To Change)

Celebrity guests

Season 2
Second season started on 4 March 2013. Sangeetha, a handicapped woman from Painavu had scored 25,00,000/- in the 3rd day of the 2nd season. For the first time in the history of the show, the season started 'All Asianet Serial Celebrities Week' which started from 15 April 2013. Sanooja Rajan was declared as the first Crorepati of the show. This sparkling moment was aired on Asianet on 30 April 2013.

The tagline used for the season was Orarivum Cheruthalla, Deyvathinte Varamaanu (English: No Knowledge is Small, It Is The Blessing Of God)

Celebrity guests

Kids Special Episode
For the first time in the history of NAK, "The Kids special episode" started on Asianet from 27 May onwards. It was also continued from 8 July 2013 due to the request of Audience.

Season 3
Third season kicked off from 29 December 2014 with the sparkling inaugural song of K S Chitra. This season started with a few differences from the last seasons. The timer from 1-5 questions was made 45 seconds and from 6-10 is 60 seconds. Also this season had the introduction of a new lifeline called 'Double Dip' replacing 'Fifty-Fifty (50/50)' from the previous seasons. This season also featured a fourth additional lifeline (not included as the main lifeline) called 'Code Red' which gave the opportunity for the contestant's family members to warn the contestant if they feel the answer is wrong.

Celebrity guests

Ningalkkum Aakam Kodeeshwaran (KIDS)

Season 4
Asianet announced the fourth season of NAK in late 2016. The first question for entry was published on the channel 7 November 2016 at 6:30 pm. Suresh Gopi hosted the fourth season. The show was launched on 16 January 2017 with Sujatha Mohan and Swetha Mohan rendering the inaugural song (Allah thero Naah).

Celebrity guests

Kodeeshwaran Junior
This is a special round that contained school students as the contestants. The episodes were telecasted from 1 May 2017 to 10 May 2017, from 5 June 2017 to 9 June 2017 and again from 19 June 2017 to 23 June 2017.

Rules
The standard Millionaire format is used, with the Fastest Finger contest before the main game.

The money won after each question is roughly doubled from the previous amount won, exponentially increasing the amount won after each correct answer until the contestant reaches the final question, after which they win the maximum prize (1 crore).

Prize table

Lifelines
A contestant can use a lifeline when he/she is undecided about which answer is correct. A lifeline can only be used once.
 Audience Poll: If the contestant uses this lifeline, it will result in the host repeating the question to the audience. The studio audience get 10 seconds to answer the question. Audience members use touch pads to designate what they believe the correct answer to be. After the audience have chosen their choices, the results are displayed to the contestant in percentages in bar-graph format and also shown on the monitors screens of the host and contestant, as well as the TV viewers.
 Phone a Friend: If the contestant uses this lifeline, the contestant is allowed to call one of the three pre-arranged friends, who all have to provide their phone numbers in advance. The host usually starts off by talking to the contestant's friend and introduces him/her to the viewers. After the introduction, the host hands the phone call over to the contestant who then immediately has 30 seconds to ask and hope for a reply from their friend.
 Fifty-Fifty (50/50) (except season 3): If the contestant uses this lifeline, the host will ask the computer to randomly remove and eliminate two of the "wrong" answers. This will leave one right answer and one wrong answer, resulting in a situation of eliminating 50% of the choices as well as having a 50% chance of getting the answer right if the contestant is in a situation of making a guess.
Double Dip (for season 3): This lifeline allows the contestant to make two guesses at a question. Getting both answers incorrect results in the contestant's winnings dropping back down to the last milestone achieved. This lifeline differs from others in that once the player has chosen to use this lifeline, he/she must answer the question, and cannot walk away or use any further lifelines on that question.
Code Red (from season 3) which gives the opportunity for the contestant's family members to warn the contestant if they feel the answer is wrong.

Records
Sanooja Rajan from Nedumangad, Thiruvananthapuram made history by winning the top prize (1,00,00,000/-) in Season 2. This made Ningalkkum Aajam Kodeeswaran as the second version after KBC to have a top score winner in India. Shyla C. K was the top scorer of Ningalkum Aakaam Kodeeshwaran in Season 1, winning 50 lacs. This season also witnessed the game played by pairs other than Individuals while previously pairs game were allowed only for celebrities.

Top scorers

See also
 Kaun Banega Crorepati
 Neengalum Vellalam Oru Kodi
 Kannadada Kotyadhipati
 Meelo Evaru Koteeswarudu
 Ko Banchha Crorepati

References

External links
 
 

Who Wants to Be a Millionaire?
2012 Indian television series debuts
2012 Indian television series endings
2013 Indian television series debuts
2013 Indian television series endings
Indian reality television series
Indian television series
Indian game shows
Indian television series based on British television series
Asianet (TV channel) original programming
Malayalam-language television shows